Junction City is a town in Talbot County, Georgia, United States. The population was 179 at the 2000 census.

History
Junction City was platted at the site of a railway junction, hence the name. The Georgia General Assembly incorporated Junction City as a town in 1906.

Geography

Junction City is located at  (32.603083, -84.458190).

The city is located along the Fall Line Freeway (GA state routes 96 and 540), which runs west to east through the town, leading east 15 mi (24 km) to Butler and west 39 mi (63 km) to Columbus. Georgia State Route 90 also runs through the town, leading northwest 8 mi (13 km) to Talbotton, the county seat, and southeast 8 mi (13 km) to Mauk.

Demographics

As of the census of 2000, there were 179 people, 69 households, and 46 families residing in the town. The racial makeup of the town was 38.55% White, 60.34% African American and 1.12% Native American. Hispanic or Latino of any race were 0.56% of the population.

There were 69 households, out of which 34.8% had children under the age of 18 living with them, 50.7% were married couples living together, 11.6% had a female householder with no husband present, and 33.3% were non-families. 29.0% of all households were made up of individuals, and 11.6% had someone living alone who was 65 years of age or older.  The average household size was 2.59 and the average family size was 3.24.

In the town, the population was spread out, with 24.6% under the age of 18, 6.1% from 18 to 24, 27.4% from 25 to 44, 24.6% from 45 to 64, and 17.3% who were 65 years of age or older.  The median age was 40 years. For every 100 females, there were 101.1 males.  For every 100 females age 18 and over, there were 104.5 males.

The median income for a household in the town was $26,250, and the median income for a family was $47,500. Males had a median income of $29,375 versus $21,250 for females. The per capita income for the town was $15,310.  About 10.5% of families and 15.1% of the population were below the poverty line, including 5.3% of those under the age of eighteen and 29.4% of those 65 or over.

References

Towns in Talbot County, Georgia
Towns in Georgia (U.S. state)